Témiscaming/Lac Kipawa Water Aerodrome, formerly , was located  northeast of Témiscaming, Quebec, Canada.

References

Airports in Abitibi-Témiscamingue
Defunct seaplane bases in Quebec